Daniel Turner Holmes (23 February 1863 – 7 April 1955) was a Scottish Liberal Party politician who sat in the House of Commons from 1911 to 1918 as the Member of Parliament (MP) for Govan.

Holmes was educated at the University of London, the University of Geneva and the University of Paris. He was an assistant examiner at the University of London, taught at Greenock Academy and Paisley Grammar School, and wrote and lectured on literature before becoming an MP.

Holmes was elected to parliament at the 1911 by-election in Govan, caused by the appointment of the Liberal incumbent William Hunter as a Judge of the Court of Session. Holmes was elected by a margin of 936, a majority more than 1000 votes less than that of his predecessor. A key issue in the contest was the National Insurance Act which Holmes supported. He maid his maiden speech in the House of Commons on 1 April 1912 in a debate on the Temperance (Scotland) Bill.

He married Margaret Eadie (died 1953) in 1896. Their daughter, Margaret, married William Wedgewood Benn in 1920, and the parliamentary connection continued in the following generation with Tony Benn. His great-grandson is former cabinet minister Hilary Benn.

Works
Literary tours in the Highlands and islands of Scotland, 1909
A Scot in France and Switzerland, 1910

References

External links 
 
 
 

1863 births
1955 deaths
Scottish Liberal Party MPs
Scottish expatriates in France
Scottish expatriates in Switzerland
Members of the Parliament of the United Kingdom for Glasgow constituencies
Alumni of the University of London
UK MPs 1910–1918
University of Geneva alumni
People from Irvine, North Ayrshire
University of Paris alumni